Sokolovsky is a rural locality (a settlement) in Kolenovskoye Rural Settlement, Novokhopyorsky District, Voronezh Oblast, Russia. The population was 66 as of 2010.

Geography 
Sokolovsky is located 53 km southwest of Novokhopyorsk (the district's administrative centre) by road. Dolinovsky is the nearest rural locality.

References 

Populated places in Novokhopyorsky District